Zara, sometimes also called Zaraha (former name is: Maliorano) is a town and commune in Madagascar. It belongs to the district of Midongy-Atsimo, which is a part of Atsimo-Atsinanana Region. There are 1851 inscribed voters in this commune.

To this commune belong also the villages of:

Ambodisahy
Ankalatany
Beharena
Bevaho
Mahabe, Zara
Marovovo
Mikaiky
Sahanety
Tsararano, Zara

References and notes 

Populated places in Atsimo-Atsinanana